Collaboration with the Islamic State refers to the cooperation and assistance given by governments, non-state actors, and private individuals to the Islamic State (IS) during the Syrian Civil War, Iraqi Civil War, and Libyan Civil War.

Allegations of state support

Israel

The Syrian government and Iranian officials have accused Israel and the United States government of supporting ISIS by attacking Hezbollah and the Syrian Arab Army as well as arming and giving medical attention to the Islamic State. Israel has strenuously denied accusations of providing arms and medical support to Islamic State fighters.

Syria

During the ongoing Syrian Civil War, President Bashar al-Assad, the Syrian government have been accused by activists of collusion with ISIL.

Many Islamist prisoners were released from Syrian prisons during the Arab Spring protests in 2011, which many authors have suggested a indicated strategic attempt to strengthen jihadist factions over other rebels, and eventually contributed to forging ISIL.

The Syrian government has reportedly paid for the protection of oil pipelines and importation of oil from Al-Nusra after Al-Nusra’s capture of two major oil pipelines in Banias and Latakia. and jointly ran a gas plant in Tabqah using intermediates. The facility supplied electricity to government-held areas, while sources claim government-run power plants supplied Al-Nusra held areas. A report in 2015 suggested that ISIL kept gas flowing to Assad regime-controlled power stations. Furthermore, ISIL allowed grain to pass from Rojava to government-controlled areas at the cost of a 25% levy. In 2017, US and European officials said that oil sales to the Syrian government were ISIL's largest source of revenue.

An unpublished IHS Jane's Terrorism and Insurgency Center database analysis showed that only 6% of Syrian government forces attacks were targeted at ISIL from January to November 2014, while in the same period only 13% of all ISIL attacks targeted government forces.

The National Coalition for Syrian Revolutionary and Opposition Forces has stated that the Syrian government has operatives inside ISIL, as has the leadership of Ahrar ash-Sham.

In 2015, the United States embassy in Syria stated that the Syrian government was "making air-strikes in support" of an ISIL advance on Syrian opposition positions north of Aleppo. The president of the Syrian National Coalition, Khaled Koja, accused Assad of acting "as an air force for [ISIL]", with the Defence Minister of the SNC Salim Idris stating that approximately 180 Syrian government officers were serving in ISIL and coordinating the group's attacks with the Syrian Army.

In April 2017 report by UK information provider IHS Markit stated that the Islamic State fought Syrian government forces more than any other opponent between 1 April 2016 and 31 March 2017. According to the report, "43 percent of all Islamic State fighting in Syria was directed against President Assad's forces, 17 against the U.S.-backed Syrian Democratic Forces (SDF) and the remaining 40 percent involved fighting rival Sunni opposition groups".

Turkey
The Turkish government has been criticised for allowing ISIL to use Turkish territory for logistics and channelling recruits. It has also been accused of selling arms and intelligence to ISIL, as part of its campaign against the People's Protection Units (YPG). That ISIL leader Abu Bakr al-Baghdadi's Syrian hideout was found just a few  kilometers away from Turkey also raised suspicions whether Turkey was doing enough against ISIL. Iraqi intelligence officers also claimed that they have observed several journeys by relatives of Al Baghdadi between Syria and Turkey. Turkey denies the allegations of assisting ISIL, pointing to multiple terrorist attacks ISIL has committed against civilians in Turkey, as well as multiple military confrontations between ISIL and the Turkish government. The Kurdistan Democratic Party in Iraq similarly deny the claim that Turkey is providing aid to ISIL. According to an intelligence adviser quoted by Seymour Hersh, a "highly classified assessment" carried out by the Defense Intelligence Agency (DIA) and the Joint Chiefs of Staff in 2013 concluded that Turkey had effectively transformed the secret U.S. arms program in support of moderate rebels, who no longer existed, into an indiscriminate program to provide technical and logistical support for al-Nusra Front and ISIL.

Saudi Arabia

In June 2014, former Iraqi Prime Minister Nouri al-Maliki accused the government of Saudi Arabia of funding ISIL. The Saudi Arabian government rejected the claims.

Some media outlets, such as NBC, the BBC, The New York Times, and the US-based think tank Washington Institute for Near East Policy have written about individual Saudi donations to the group and the Saudi state's decade-long sponsorship of Salafism and Wahhabism around the world, but concluded in 2014 that there was no evidence of direct Saudi state support for ISIL.

In an August 2014 email leaked by WikiLeaks, apparently from former US Secretary of State Hillary Clinton to then counselor John Podesta, a memo states that the governments of both Saudi Arabia and Qatar "are providing clandestine financial and logistic support to ISIL and other radical Sunni groups in the region."

Lebanese former minister Charbel Wehbe also accused Saudi Arabia of supporting ISIL.

Qatar

Qatar has long been accused of acting as a conduit for the flow of funds to ISIL. While there is no proof that the Qatari government is involved in this movement of funds, it has been criticised for not doing enough to stem money sent by private donors in the country. According to some reports, US officials believe that the largest portion of private donations supporting ISIS and al Qaeda-linked groups now comes from Qatar rather than Saudi Arabia.

In August 2014, German minister Gerd Müller accused Qatar of having links to ISIL, stating: "You have to ask who is arming, who is financing ISIS troops. The keyword there is Qatar." Qatari Foreign Minister Khalid bin Mohammad Al Attiyah rejected this statement, saying: "Qatar does not support extremist groups, including [ISIL], in any way. We are repelled by their views, their violent methods and their ambitions."

United States

Rand Paul, junior U.S. Senator from Kentucky, has accused the U.S. government of indirectly supporting ISIL in the Syrian Civil War, by arming their allies and fighting their enemies in that country. The US assisted the Syrian opposition from 2013 to 2017 to fight both ISIL and the Assad government (see CIA-led Timber Sycamore program); some of the weapons supplied were captured by ISIL. Donald Trump has claimed that Barack Obama and Hillary Clinton "[were] the founder[s] of ISIS".

Foreign nationals

A United Nations report  showed that 25,000 "foreign terrorist fighters" from 100 countries had joined "Islamist" groups, many of them working for ISIL or al-Qaeda. The US-trained commander of Tajikistan's Interior Ministry OMON police special forces, Gulmurod Khalimov, has been raised to the rank of "Minister of War" within the Islamic State.

One of the most prominent commanders of ISIL in Syria, Abu Omar al-Shishani, served previously as a sergeant in the Georgian Army before being medically discharged, later imprisoned, becoming radicalized, then fleeing the country.

A 2015 report by the Program on Extremism at George Washington University found 71 individuals charged in the United States with supporting ISIL, 250 travelling or attempting to travel to Syria or Iraq from the United States to join ISIL, and about 900 active domestic ISIL-related investigations.

An October 2016 World Bank study found that "ISIL's foreign fighters are surprisingly well-educated." Using the fighters' self-reported educational levels, the study concluded that "69% of recruits reported at least a secondary-level education" of which "a large fraction have gone on to study at university" and also that "only 15% of recruits left school before high school; less than 2% are illiterate." The study also found that foreign fighters are often more educated than their countrymen where those "from Europe and in Central Asia have similar levels of education to their countrymen" while those "from the Middle East, North Africa, and South and East Asia are significantly more educated than what is typical in their home nations." The report notes that its conclusions that terrorism is not driven by poverty and low levels of education which conforms with previous research. However, the report did find a strong correlation "between a country's male unemployment rate and the propensity of the country to supply foreign fighters".  Many European countries have allowed their citizens that joined ISIL to be prosecuted by Iraq.

Pakistan

Former President of Afghanistan, Hamid Karzai accused Pakistan for supporting ISIS during interview with ANI that Afghanistan has evidence of Pakistan's support to ISIS. He added that there is no doubt to the above statement.
Pakistan has strenuously denied accusations of providing arms and medical support to Islamic State fighters.

Foreign nationals by country

Australia
In August 2018, Australia stripped the Australian citizenship from five terrorists who had travelled to fight with the Islamic State and barred them from entering Australia again. This was only possible because they had double citizenships because international law stops the measure from being used on individuals with only one citizenship. The five brought the total to six.

Belgium
Up to 2018, an estimated 450 individuals had travelled from Belgium to join the civil war in Syria and Iraq. Of those, 75 were linked to the Sharia4Belgium network. In July 2018, courts announced that Belgium had no obligation to bring children of Islamic State members to Belgium.

Denmark
In November 2017, Denmark stripped a Turkish man of his Danish citizenship after having been sentenced for terror offenses related to the Islamic State, which left him with a citizenship of Turkey.

France
Up to 2018, an estimated 1700 individuals had travelled from France to join the civil war in Syria and Iraq.

Germany
Up to 2018, an estimated 940 individuals had travelled from Germany to join the civil war in Syria and Iraq.

India

Up to 2019, about a 100 Indian nationals had joined the IS in Syria and Afghanistan while 155 individuals had been arrested for IS-related connections. Many of these came from the southern Indian state of Kerala and also from Tamil Nadu, Karnataka and Maharashtra. These numbers are considered relatively low despite India having the third-largest population of Muslims [as of 2020]. The limited involvement of Indian Muslim fighters in calls for global jihad was also observed during the Soviet–Afghan War, and various reasons have been given for this. These include the limited influence of Salafi-Wahabbism in India, inability of IS sympathizers in India to travel to IS controlled territories due to logistical factors and poverty among Indian Muslims, the existing presence of Pakistani militant groups such as Lashkar-e-Taiba and Jaish-e-Muhammad with which the IS is in open strife, and the opposition of Indian Islamic leadership to such groups (with 70,000 Barelvi clerics issuing a fatwa condemning IS and similar organisations in 2015).

Netherlands
The Parliament of Netherlands voted in 2016 for legislation to strip Dutch citizens who join ISIL or al Qaeda abroad of their citizenship, also if they have not been convicted of any crime. The law can only be applied to individuals with double citizenship. Justice Minister Ard Van der Steur stated the legal changes were necessary to stop jihadists from returning to the Netherlands. In September 2017, four jihadists were stripped of their citizenship.

In the 2012 to November 2018 period, more than 310 individuals had travelled from the Netherlands to the conflict in Syria and Iraq. Of those 85 had been killed and 55 returned to the Netherlands. Of the surviving Dutch foreign fighters in the region, 135 are fighters in the conflict zone and three quarters are members of ISIL. The remaining quarter have joined Al-Qaeda affiliated groups such as Hay'at Tahrir al-Sham or Tanzim Hurras al-Deen.

Sweden

Up to 2018, an estimated 300 individuals had travelled from Sweden to join the civil war in Syria. In March 2018 Kurdish authorities reported they had captured 41 IS supporters with either Swedish citizenship or residence permit in Sweden, of which 5 had key positions in the organisation and one was the head of the ISIL propaganda efforts.

United Kingdom
Cabinet minister William Hague stated in 2014 that up to 400 British citizens had joined ISIL. The government instituted a practice where if those who had joined had double citizenships were stripped of their British citizenship to prevent them from arriving back in the UK. By 2017, 150 individuals had been stripped of citizenship and were thus unable to enter the United Kingdom again.

Groups expressing support for ISIL
The Terrorism Research and Analysis Consortium (TRAC) has identified 60 jihadist groups in 30 countries that have pledged allegiance to or support for ISIL as of mid-November 2014. That many of these groups were previously affiliated with al-Qaeda suggests a shift in global jihadist leadership towards ISIL.

Members of the following groups have declared support for ISIL, either fully or in part:

 Boko Haram (until 2016)
  Ansar al-Sharia (Tunisia)
 Jund al-Khilafah
 Mujahideen Shura Council in the Environs of Jerusalem
 Jamaah Ansharut Tauhid – (pledged support to ISIL; the majority of the group split off after its leader pledged allegiance to ISIL)
 Islamic Movement of Uzbekistan
 Jundallah (Pakistan)
 Caucasus Emirate (multiple Caucasus Emirate commanders switched allegiance to ISIL)
 Sheikh Omar Hadid Brigade
 Khalifa Islamiyah Mindanao
 Jemaah Islamiyah
 Abu Sayyaf
 Bangsamoro Islamic Freedom Fighters
 Ansar Khalifa Philippines
Islamic Defenders Front (FPI): Pledged allegiance and support to ISIL in 2014. Only revealed in 2020 by the government upon its ban.)

In Islamic State territory

Syria
In response to the effort to take Raqqa by the Syrian Democratic Forces, whose main component is the Kurdish People's Protection Units (YPG), some Syrian Arabs in Raqqa sided with the Islamic State.

Iraq

Sunni Arabs in Iraq have been accused of collaborating with ISIL against Assyrians, and Yazidis, and Shias. ISIL marked Christian homes with the letter nūn for Naṣārā and Shia homes with the letter rāʾ for Rāfiḍa, derogatory terms used to describe Christians and Shias by some Sunni Muslims. Properties were confiscated and given to local ISIL supporters or foreign fighters. Local Sunnis were reported to have betrayed Yazidis once ISIL arrived, or colluded in advance to lure them into staying put until the ISIL invaded.

57 members of the Arab Socialist Ba'ath Party – Iraq Region participated in the massacre of at least 1,566 Shia cadets from the Iraqi Air Force on 12 June 2014.

See also
 Collaborationism

References